Belen is a village in the Dargeçit District of Mardin Province in Turkey. The village is populated by Kurds of the Elîkan tribe and had a population of 69 in 2021.

References 

Villages in Dargeçit District
Kurdish settlements in Mardin Province